Maubara, officially Maubara Administrative Post, is an administrative post (and was formerly a subdistrict) in Liquiçá municipality, East Timor, just west of the city of Liquiçá.

References

External links 

  – information page on Ministry of State Administration site 

Administrative posts of East Timor
Liquiçá Municipality